The Bamako Initiative was a formal statement adopted by African health ministers in 1987 in Bamako, Mali, to implement strategies designed to increase the availability of essential drugs and other healthcare services for Sub-Saharan Africans.

The idea as proposed by UNICEF's executive director, James P. Grant, was for UNICEF and other donors to supply drugs to countries which would be sold a little above cost. The profits from these sales would be used to buy more drugs in a self-sustaining way.  By 1988, 20 countries in Sub-Saharan Africa were making plans.

A Health Policy and Planning article by Hardon (1990; 5: 186-189) describes the initiative as follows:

Measures
The Bamako Initiative proposed decentralising health decision making to local levels and establishing  realistic national drug policies to enhance the provision of essential drugs for Sub-Saharan Africans.

Challenges

There were several problems with the initiative such as discrimination against the poorest, a national health care dependent on the sale of drugs, and the requirement of foreign currency to import drugs versus an income in local currency.  Health Action International an NGO working in health policy started discussion forums around the continent to encourage discussion and address these and other issues with the initiative.

References

External links
 UNICEF  - The Bamako Initiative

 Manageable Bamako Initiative schemes
 Providing essential drugs — The Bamako Initiative

World Health Organization
Health in Africa
Bamako
1987 in Africa
History of Mali